The Sumathi Best Television Educational Program Award is presented annually in Sri Lanka by the Sumathi  for the best Sri Lankan television educational program..

The award was first given in 2011. Following is a list of the winners since then.

References

Awards established in 2011
2011 establishments in Sri Lanka